Purushanai Kaikkulla Pottukkanum is a 1994 Indian Tamil-language comedy film directed by Balanna in his debut. The film stars Janagaraj, Manjula, Nizhalgal Ravi, Sreeja and Pallavi. It is a remake of the 1990 Telugu film Mama Alludu. The film was released on 18 March 1994.

Plot

Cast 
 Janagaraj
 Manjula
 Nizhalgal Ravi
 Sreeja
 John Babu
 Pallavi

Production 
Purushanai Kaikkulla Pottukkanum, a remake of the 1990 Telugu film Mama Alludu, is the directorial debut of Balanna. It was produced by M. Vijay Kothari of Kothari Creations. Cinematography was handled by G. Rajendran, and editing by A. P. Manivannan.

Soundtrack 
The soundtrack was composed by S. A. Rajkumar, who also worked as lyricist alongside Vairamuthu.

Release and reception 
Purushanai Kaikkulla Pottukkanum was released on 18 March 1994. Malini Mannath of The Indian Express called it "an average entertainer that lays more emphasis on the spoken word than visuals." R. P. R. of Kalki said the film's plus points were the clear purpose and non-confusing screenplay.

References

External links 
 

1990s Tamil-language films
1994 comedy films
1994 directorial debut films
1994 films
Films scored by S. A. Rajkumar
Indian comedy films
Tamil remakes of Telugu films